Caerosternus is a genus of clown beetles in the family Histeridae. There is one described species in Caerosternus, C. americanus.

References

Further reading

 
 

Histeridae
Articles created by Qbugbot